Couverture chocolate is a chocolate that contains a higher percentage of cocoa butter (32–39%) than baking or eating chocolate. This additional cocoa butter, combined with proper tempering, gives the chocolate more sheen, a firmer "snap" when broken, and a creamy mellow flavor.

Definition and term 
The total "percentage" cited on many brands of chocolate is based on some combination of cocoa butter in relation to cocoa solids (cacao). In order to be properly labeled as "couverture", the dark chocolate product must contain not less than 35% total dry cocoa solids, including not less than 31% cocoa butter and not less than 2.5% of dry non-fat cocoa solids, milk chocolate couverture must contain not less than 25% dry cocoa solids. Couverture is used by professionals for dipping, coating, molding and garnishing.

The term "couverture chocolate" is distinct from compound chocolate. Products that contain compound chocolate have a lower percentage of solids and contain non-cocoa fats.

Some brands of couverture chocolate are packaged tempered, and others are packaged untempered. Subsequent tempering may or may not be required, depending on the usage and the desired characteristics of the final product.

See also

Enrobing
Types of chocolate
Cake decorating

References

External links

 Cooking For Engineers – Kitchen Notes: Tempering Chocolate – step-by-step tempering instructions

Chocolate